Cathy Edwards may refer to:
 Cathy Edwards (politician)
 Cathy Edwards (software engineer)